Michael Raymond Bales (born August 6, 1971) is a Canadian former professional ice hockey goaltender. He played in the National Hockey League over four seasons from 1992 to 1997 with the Boston Bruins and the Ottawa Senators, accumulating a record of 2–15–1 and a goals against average of 4.13 in 23 games. He currently serves as goaltending coach for the NHL's Buffalo Sabres.

Playing career

Bales attended Ohio State University, lettering with the Buckeyes from 1990 to 1992, and was drafted by the Boston Bruins in the fifth round, 105th overall, of the 1990 NHL Entry Draft. Bales' entire career as a Boston Bruin consists of 25 minutes played in one game against the New Jersey Devils on January 9, 1993, during which he gave up one goal. His busiest NHL season was 1995–96, when he appeared in 20 games for Ottawa.

In 2001, Bales moved to play in Europe, beginning with the Belfast Giants in the British Ice Hockey Superleague. He then moved to the Deutsche Eishockey Liga in Germany for ERC Ingolstadt and then to the Elitserien in Sweden for Leksands IF. From 2004 to 2010 he played for the Straubing Tigers where he scored his first career goal during the 2005–06 season with the Tigers. On January 29, 2011, he signed a contract with the Iserlohn Roosters as stand-by-goalie but ultimately never played a game for the team.

Transactions
  Selected by Boston Bruins in fifth round (fourth Bruins pick, 105th overall) of National Hockey League entry draft, June 16, 1990.
  Signed as free agent by Ottawa Senators, July 4, 1994.
  Signed as free agent by Buffalo Sabres, September 9, 1997.
  Signed as free agent by Dallas Stars (two year contract), July 8, 1998.

Coaching

On July 23, 2011, the Pittsburgh Penguins hired Bales as a goaltender development coach and amateur scout. Bales was promoted to goaltender coach by the Penguins on August 19, 2013. In 2017, he became goaltending coach of the Carolina Hurricanes. On June 12, 2019 Bales resigned from the Hurricanes and became goaltending coach for the Buffalo Sabres.

Career statistics

Regular season and playoffs

Notes
1.http://www.post-gazette.com/pg/11204/1162507-61.stm

References

External links

www.mike-bales.de - Unofficial Webpage
Roosters engage Stand-by-Goalie

1971 births
Living people
Baltimore Bandits players
Belfast Giants players
Boston Bruins draft picks
Boston Bruins players
Buffalo Sabres coaches
Canadian ice hockey goaltenders
Carolina Hurricanes coaches
ERC Ingolstadt players
Estevan Bruins players
Ice hockey people from Saskatchewan
Leksands IF players
Kalamazoo Wings (1974–2000) players
Ohio State Buckeyes men's ice hockey players
Ottawa Senators players
Pittsburgh Penguins coaches
Prince Edward Island Senators players
Providence Bruins players
Rochester Americans players
Sportspeople from Prince Albert, Saskatchewan
Straubing Tigers players
Utah Grizzlies (IHL) players
Canadian expatriate ice hockey players in Northern Ireland
Canadian expatriate ice hockey players in Germany
Canadian expatriate ice hockey players in Sweden
Canadian expatriate ice hockey players in the United States
Canadian ice hockey coaches